Maik Szarszewski (born 14 May 1972) is a German Paralympic archer.

He has competed three times at the Summer Paralympics, four times at the World Para Archery Championships and three times at the Para Continental Championships.

References

External links
 
 

1972 births
Living people
German male archers
Paralympic archers of Germany
Archers at the 2012 Summer Paralympics
Archers at the 2016 Summer Paralympics
Archers at the 2020 Summer Paralympics
People from Miltenberg
Sportspeople from Lower Franconia